Bloody Kisses is the third studio album by the American gothic metal band Type O Negative and the last recording with their original lineup, as drummer Sal Abruscato left the group in late 1993 to join labelmates Life of Agony. The album includes two of their best known songs, "Christian Woman" and "Black No. 1 (Little Miss Scare-All)", both of which earned the band a considerable cult following. The album further established recurring motifs of the band's music, such as including cover songs recorded in their own unique style, sample-heavy soundscape interludes and lyrics replete with dry, satirical humor.

Bloody Kisses is notable for being the first album released on Roadrunner Records to achieve gold and, later, platinum record sales certification.

Music and lyrics
Considered a classic in the gothic metal genre, Bloody Kisses is "saturated with complex patterns of sound" layered with Peter Steele's trademark baritone vocals and lyrics relating to topics such as sex, religion, image, racism and death.

According to Decibel, Bloody Kisses "featured infectious doom-pop epics ("Black No. 1 (Little Miss Scare-All)", "Christian Woman"), sarcastic hardcore screeds ("Kill All the White People", "We Hate Everyone")" and bizarre noise interludes ("Fay Wray Come Out and Play", "Dark Side of the Womb", "3.0.I.F.")".

"Black No. 1 (Little Miss Scare-All)" is "a sarcastic ode to goth girls (and their trademark, black hair dye) based on a narcissistic ex-girlfriend of singer/songwriter Peter Steele".

Bloody Kisses includes a cover of the classic Seals & Crofts' track, "Summer Breeze". Type O Negative's original recording of the song included alternate lyrics, written by Peter Steele, and was retitled "Summer Girl". However, original songwriters Seals & Crofts, found Steele's "Summer Girl" lyrics distasteful and the band was forced to re-record the vocals and remix the track with the song's original lyrics and title intact.

When played in its entirety, top to bottom, the album's songs and noise interludes constitute one seamless composition. The band would continue this tradition on the World Coming Down LP released in 1999.

The album features additional vocal performances from close friends of the band, including Mina Caputo, Joey Zampella and Alan Robert of fellow Brooklyn-based alt-metal band Life of Agony, who are credited as "Erasmus High School Boys Special Ed." in the album's liner notes.

Founding member, drummer Sal Abruscato, would leave the band shortly after the album's completion due to Peter Steele's reluctance to commit to touring. Abruscato would join Life Of Agony, full-time, after performing on LOA's debut album, River Runs Red, recorded later that same year. River Runs Red was produced and mixed by Type O Negative keyboardist/producer Josh Silver, and was also released on Roadrunner Records in 1993. Both albums became very successful releases for the record label, and Life of Agony, with Abruscato, would open for Type O Negative during the initial Bloody Kisses tour of '93–'94.

The album artwork depicts several locations of Green-Wood Cemetery, Brooklyn, photographed by John Wadsworth

Critical reception

Bloody Kisses received mostly positive reviews. Steve Huey of AllMusic gave the album a 4.5 out of 5 and wrote that "though it sounds like a funeral, Bloody Kisses' airy melodicism and '90s-style irony actually breathed new life into the flagging goth metal genre". Rock Hard gave the album a 10 out of 10 rating.

Accolades
In 2005, Bloody Kisses was ranked number 365 in Rock Hards book of The 500 Greatest Rock & Metal Albums of All Time. Loudwire called Bloody Kisses the best album of 1993, in addition to ranking it at number 42 on its Top 90 Hard Rock and Heavy Metal Albums of the 90s. Rolling Stone placed Bloody Kisses at number 53 on its Top 100 Greatest Heavy Metal Albums of All Time list, citing memorable songs such as "Christian Woman", "Bloody Kisses (A Death in the Family)", their cover version of "Summer Breeze", and "Black No. 1". The latter was cited by the author J. D. Considine as the band's signature song.

Track listing
All music and lyrics written by Peter Steele unless otherwise noted.

Bloody Kisses (1993 digipak re-release) 
Roadrunner Records issued an alternate version of the album in a digipak later in 1993. The digipak reissue featured alternate artwork and an alternate track listing. The running order was changed and two tracks, the intro and all of the soundscape interludes were removed and were replaced with a previously unreleased track from the recording sessions. This reissue and the associated changes were made at the request of songwriter Peter Steele.
Shortly after the initial release of Bloody Kisses in 1993, Roadrunner Records reissued the album in a tri-fold digipak. This reissue featured an alternate track listing. The new track listing revised the running order and removed all of the soundscape interludes and the two "hardcore" songs ("Kill All The White People" and "We Hate Everyone") and replaced them with a previously unreleased, over eight minute long, slow and very "gothic" sounding track titled, "Suspended In Dusk". This reissue and the changes to the album were made at the request of Peter Steele.

In an interview for the liner notes of the remastered, "Top Shelf Edition" reissue of Bloody Kisses in 2009, Steele said that although he hated ripping off the public, he felt it was his opportunity to fix what he believed was a musical mistake. Guitarist Kenny Hickey, who was not a fan of "Suspended In Dusk", noted that the digipak version of the album was Steele trying to move into the vision of the band fully realized on 1996's "October Rust".

Producer and keyboardist, Josh Silver had stronger feelings on the digipak version of Bloody Kisses, stating, "the digipak sucks". Silver went on to say that part of what makes Type O Negative great is the, "eclectic insanity" - going from songs like 'Black No. 1' to 'Kill All The White People' and that brilliance was a "happy accident". Silver noted that Peter, "didn't have to understand where it came from, he just had to play it. But Peter wanted continuity, so the digipak was released."

"Summer Breeze" was initially recorded by the band as "Summer Girl" with lyrics parodying the original, but "Summer Breeze" songwriters Seals and Croft objected to the lyrical changes and the song was re-recorded with the original lyrics before the album's official release date. "Summer Girl" remains unreleased but it did appear on a pre-release, promotional version of "Bloody Kisses", simply titled, "?". "Summer Girl" has since circulated online.

The digipak version contains alternate artwork and an amended booklet that reflects the re-ordering and changing of the tracks. Another change is found in the album's liner notes which contain the title of and lyrics for "Summer Girl" instead of "Summer Breeze". The parody lyrics of "Summer Girl" are included such as, "Kenny Hickey lying on the sidewalk, Devil music from the house next door". Josh Silver said the misprint was a mistake by Roadrunner Records. The recorded song is unchanged. The standard release of the album was pressed with the original "Summer Breeze" lyrics and title in the liner notes.

Bloody Kisses - The Top Shelf Edition (2009 remastered, expanded edition re-release) 
On May 5, 2009, Roadrunner Records re-issued a newly remastered version of Bloody Kisses known as Bloody Kisses - The Top Shelf Edition. This reissue included the original album remastered for the first time, along with a bonus CD of rarities and B-sides. The package also included expanded liner notes featuring additional photos and a brand new, exclusive interview with the band on the "making of" and the "legacy of" Bloody Kisses.

Credits
 Peter Steele – lead vocals, bass guitar
 Kenny Hickey – backing vocals, co-lead vocals on "Black No. 1 (Little Miss Scare All)" and "We Hate Everyone", acoustic guitar, electric guitar
 Josh Silver – backing vocals, keyboards, synthesizers, sound effects, electronic programming
 Sal Abruscato – drums, percussion

Additional personnel 
 Paul Bento – sitar, tamboura
 The Bensonhoist Lesbian Choir – additional vocal performance 
 Erasmus High School Boys Special Ed. – additional vocal performance
 Bonnie Weiss, Karen Rose, Debbie Alter, Chris Zamp, & Life Of Agony (Alan Robert, Joey Zampella, Mina Caputo, & Mike Palmeri) – additional vocal performance
 Brooklyn Philharmonic Orchestra (Verdigris Phlogiston conducting)

Production credits 
 Produced by Peter Steele/Josh Silver
 Recorded at Systems Two, Brooklyn, NY
 Additional Recording at Sty In The Sky, Brooklyn, NY
 Mastered by George Marino at Sterling Sound, NYC
 John Wadsworth – photography
 Jeff Kitts – portrait photography

Bloody Kisses – The Top Shelf Edition (2009) reissue credits 

 Re-issue producer – Monte Connor
 Project Coordinator – Steven Hartong
 Re-mastered by George Marino at Sterling Sound, NYC, January 2009
 Liner notes – J. Bennett 
 Design – Mr. Scott Design
 Additional photography – John Wadsworth and Joseph Cullice

Charts

Album

References

External links

Type O Negative's official website

Type O Negative albums
1993 albums
Roadrunner Records albums